Saluda is an unincorporated community in Saluda Township, Jefferson County, Indiana.

History
Saluda took its name from Saluda Township. A post office was established at Saluda in 1828, and remained in operation until it was discontinued in 1903.

Geography

References

Unincorporated communities in Jefferson County, Indiana
Unincorporated communities in Indiana